Larry Border (June 3, 1951 – June 8, 2011) was an American Republican politician from West Virginia.

Border served in the West Virginia House of Delegates from 1990 until his death; he was the minority chairman of the House Health and Human Resources Committee, and served on the Finance, House Rules, and Agriculture committees as well. He had also served as minority whip during his time in the legislature. A pharmacist by trade, Border was a resident of Davisville; he died after suffering a massive stroke.

Notes

Republican Party members of the West Virginia House of Delegates
1951 births
2011 deaths
People from Wood County, West Virginia
American pharmacists
21st-century American politicians